Sankhuwasabha District is one of 14 districts of Koshi Province of eastern Nepal. The district's area is 3,480 km2 with a population of 159,203 in 2001 and 158,742 in 2011. The administrative center is Khandbari.

Bordering districts are Bhojpur, Tehrathum, Dhankuta, Solukhumbu and Taplejung in Koshi Province. Tingri County of Shigatse Prefecture in the Tibet Autonomous Region of China borders to the north.

Geography and climate

The Arun River enters from Tibet at an elevation of about 3,500 meters (11,500 feet) and flows south across the district, forming one of the world's deepest valleys relative to 8,481 meter Makalu to the west and 8,586 meter Kangchenjunga to the east.

Demographics
At the time of the 2011 Nepal census, Sankhuwasabha District had a population of 158,742. Of these, 46.1% spoke Nepali, 8.8% Tamang, 8.0% Sherpa, 6.6% Kulung, 5.0% Limbu, 4.3% Yakkha, 3.2% Yamphu, 2.9% Gurung, 2.3% Magar, 2.2% Rai, 1.9% Newar, 1.8% Lohorung, 1.6% Mewahang, 1.1% Khaling, 0.9% Chamling, 0.6% Thulung, 0.4% Lhomi, 0.3% Maithili, 0.2% Bantawa, 0.2% Nachhiring, 0.1% Bahing, 0.1% Bhujel, 0.1% Dumi, 0.1% Jerung, 0.1% Koi, 0.1% Sampang, 0.1% Sindhi and 0.5% other languages as their first language.

In terms of ethnicity/caste, 18.3% were Chhetri, 10.7% Rai, 10.5% Tamang, 6.2% Kulung, 5.8% Sherpa, 5.5% Limbu, 5.4% Gurung, 5.3% Hill Brahmin, 4.8% Kami, 4.7% Newar, 4.5% Yakkha, 3.3% Magar, 2.7% Yamphu, 2.2% Bhote, 2.2% Damai/Dholi, 1.4% Mewahang Bala, 1.3% Sarki, 0.7% Sanyasi/Dasnami, 0.6% Kumal, 0.6% Lohorung, 0.5% Gharti/Bhujel, 0.5% Lhomi, 0.4% Thulung, 0.3% Khaling, 0.2% Chamling, 0.1% Kayastha, 0.1% Majhi, 0.1% Marwadi, 0.1% Nachhiring, 0.1% Thakuri and 0.5% others.

In terms of religion, 42.7% were Hindu, 28.8% Kirati, 26.6% Buddhist, 1.5% Christian, 0.1% Prakriti and 0.3% others.

In terms of literacy, 69.3% could read and write, 2.8% could only read and 27.8% could neither read nor write.

See also
Arun Valley
Tumlingtar Airport
khadbari
Panchkhapan
Chainpur

References

External links

 
Districts of Nepal established in 1962
Districts of Koshi Province